DWSN (97.9 FM), broadcasting as Mom's Radio 97.9, was a radio station owned and operated by Southern Broadcasting Network. The station's studio and transmitter were located at the SBN compound, Tupaz Street corner Muslim Community Road, Laoag, Ilocos Norte.

References

Radio stations established in 1980
Radio stations in Ilocos Norte
Radio stations disestablished in 2018
Defunct radio stations in the Philippines